Southampton Saints were a  speedway team which operated from 1928 until its closure in 1963. Its track was located at Banister Court Stadium in Southampton, Hampshire.

History
Southampton was one of the founder members of the 1929 Speedway Southern League, one of the two leagues that came into existence that year. They finished runner-up in the 1929 league and the 1930 Speedway Southern League before joining the National league in 1932. However, halfway through the 1932 National Association Trophy they withdrew and the operation moved to London, with the team becoming the Clapton Saints. The Southampton team returned in 1936 and won the second tier of British speedway, the 1936 Provincial Speedway League.

They were National League runners up in 1961 and National League champions in 1962. The club closed in 1963 when the promoter, Charles Knott, sold the stadium to developers.

Notable riders
 Dick Bradley
 Barry Briggs
 Brian Crutcher
 Billy Dallison
 Frank Goulden
 Bill Holden
 Björn Knutsson
 Brian McKeown
 Geoff Mardon
 Cordy Milne
 Olle Nygren
 Jack Parker
 Ernie Rickman
 Cyril Roger
 Alec Statham
 Fred Strecker
 Chum Taylor

Season summary

+ 6th when league was suspended

References

Defunct British speedway teams
Sport in Southampton